Erik Nicolás López Samaniego (born 27 November 2001) is a Paraguayan professional footballer who plays as a forward for Major League Soccer club Atlanta United.

Club career

Olimpia
Born in Asunción, López began his career in youth system of Olimpia. On 25 August 2019, López made his professional debut for Olimpia in the Primera División against Deportivo Santaní. He started and also scored his first goal in the 28th minute as Olimpia won 4–0. In the following two matches, López scored another two goals, one each against Deportivo Capiatá and San Lorenzo.

López finished his first professional season at Olimpia with 4 goals in 15 matches.

Atlanta United
On 18 July 2020, López signed with Major League Soccer club Atlanta United on a contract starting prior to the 2021 season. For the 2020 season, López would join Atlanta United 2, the reserve side of Atlanta United, in the USL Championship.

Loan to Banfield
On 22 February 2022, López was loan to Banfield for the 2022 season.

International career
In 2020, López was called-in as part of the Paraguay squad for the CONMEBOL Pre-Olympic Tournament. He made his debut for the Paraguay under-23s on 19 January 2020 against Uruguay, starting in a 1–0 defeat.

Career statistics

Honours
Olimpia
Primera División: 2019 Torneo Clausura

References

External links
 Profile at Major League Soccer

2001 births
Living people
Sportspeople from Asunción
Paraguayan footballers
Paraguayan expatriate footballers
Association football forwards
Paraguay youth international footballers
Club Olimpia footballers
Atlanta United 2 players
Atlanta United FC players
Club Atlético Banfield footballers
Paraguayan Primera División players
USL Championship players
Major League Soccer players
Argentine Primera División players
Paraguayan expatriate sportspeople in the United States
Paraguayan expatriate sportspeople in Argentina
Expatriate soccer players in the United States
Expatriate footballers in Argentina